Jeanne Leocadie de Tramcourt (9 December 1875, Tracy-sur-Loire, France – 2 January 1952 in Stjärnhov, Södermanland) was the French long term girlfriend of Prince Wilhelm of Sweden. The couple had a relationship from 1914 until 1952.

Tramcourt married the Swedish sculptor Christian Eriksson in 1894 and divorced him in 1911, and was during her marriage well known within Swedish art circles. Her relationship to prince Wilhelm started in 1914 and lasted until her death, and their relationship is described as a happy one. The couple never married, but lived together on Stenhammar Palace; from 1932, she was called his "hostess" and their relationship was privately recognized, though never officially, and she was never seen in public.

Jeanne de Tramcourt died in a car accident as a passenger while Wilhelm was driving.

References 
 Lars Elgklou (1978). Bernadotte. Historien - eller historier - om en familj.. Stockholm: Askild & Kärnekull Förlag AB

Mistresses of Swedish royalty
1875 births
1952 deaths
Road incident deaths in Sweden